Shihua is a subdistrict and the seat of Midong District, in the northern part of Ürümqi, Xinjiang, People's Republic of China, located about  north of the city centre. , it has six residential communities (社区) under its administration.

See also 
 List of township-level divisions of Xinjiang

References 

Township-level divisions of Xinjiang